A biopsy is a medical test commonly performed by a surgeon, interventional radiologist, or an interventional cardiologist. The process involves extraction of sample cells or tissues for examination to determine the presence or extent of a disease. The tissue is then fixed, dehydrated, embedded, sectioned, stained and mounted before it  is generally examined under a microscope by a pathologist; it may also be analyzed chemically. When an entire lump or suspicious area is removed, the procedure is called an excisional biopsy.  An incisional biopsy or core biopsy samples a portion of the abnormal tissue without attempting to remove the entire lesion or tumor. When a sample of tissue or fluid is removed with a needle in such a way that cells are removed without preserving the histological architecture of the tissue cells, the procedure is called a needle aspiration biopsy. Biopsies are most commonly performed for insight into possible cancerous or inflammatory conditions.

History

The Arab physician Abulcasis (1013–1107) developed one of the earliest diagnostic biopsies. He used a needle  to puncture a goiter and then characterized the material.

Etymology

The French dermatologist Ernest Besnier introduced the word  to the medical community in 1879.

Medical use

Cancer

When cancer is suspected, a variety of biopsy techniques can be applied. An excisional biopsy is an attempt to remove an entire lesion. When the specimen is evaluated, in addition to diagnosis, the amount of uninvolved tissue around the lesion, the surgical margin of the specimen is examined to see if the disease has spread beyond the area biopsied. "Clear margins" or "negative margins" means that no disease was found at the edges of the biopsy specimen. "Positive margins" means that disease was found, and a wider excision may be needed, depending on the diagnosis.

When intact removal is not indicated for a variety of reasons, a wedge of tissue may be taken in an incisional biopsy. In some cases, a sample can be collected by devices that "bite" a sample. A variety of sizes of needle can collect tissue in the lumen (core biopsy). Smaller diameter needles collect cells and cell clusters, fine needle aspiration biopsy.

Pathologic examination of a biopsy can determine whether a lesion is benign or malignant, and can help differentiate between different types of cancer. In contrast to a biopsy that merely samples a lesion, a larger excisional specimen called a resection may come to a pathologist, typically from a surgeon attempting to eradicate a known lesion from a patient. For example, a pathologist would examine a mastectomy specimen, even if a previous nonexcisional breast biopsy had already established the diagnosis of breast cancer. Examination of the full mastectomy specimen would confirm the exact nature of the cancer (subclassification of tumor and histologic "grading") and reveal the extent of its spread (pathologic "staging").

Liquid biopsy

There are two types of liquid biopsy (which is not really a biopsy as they are blood tests that do not require a biopsy of tissue): circulating tumor cell assays or cell-free circulating tumor DNA tests. These methods provide a non-invasive alternative to repeat invasive biopsies to monitor cancer treatment, test available drugs against the circulating tumor cells, evaluate the mutations in cancer and plan individualized treatments. In addition, because cancer is a heterogeneous genetic disease, and excisional biopsies provide only a snapshot in time of some of the rapid, dynamic genetic changes occurring in tumors, liquid biopsies provide some advantages over tissue biopsy-based genomic testing. In addition, excisional biopsies are invasive, can't be used repeatedly, and are ineffective in understanding the dynamics of tumor progression and metastasis. By detecting, quantifying and characterisation of vital circulating tumor cells or genomic alterations in CTCs and cell-free DNA in blood, liquid biopsy can provide real-time information on the stage of tumor progression, treatment effectiveness, and cancer metastasis risk. This technological development could make it possible to diagnose and manage cancer from repeated blood tests rather than from a traditional biopsy.

Circulating tumor cell tests are already available but not covered by insurance yet at maintrac and under development by many pharmaceutical companies. Those tests analyze circulating tumor cells (CTCs) Analysis of individual CTCs demonstrated a high level of heterogeneity seen at the single cell level for both protein expression and protein localization and the CTCs reflected both the primary biopsy and the changes seen in the metastatic sites.

Analysis of cell-free circulating tumor DNA (cfDNA) has an advantage over circulating tumor cells assays in that there is approximately 100 times more cell-free DNA than there is DNA in circulating tumor cells. These tests analyze fragments of tumor-cell DNA that are continuously shed by tumors into the bloodstream. Companies offering cfDNA next generation sequencing testing include Personal Genome Diagnostics and Guardant Health. These tests are moving into widespread use when a tissue biopsy has insufficient material for DNA testing or when it is not safe to do an invasive biopsy procedure, according to a recent report of results on over 15,000 advanced cancer patients sequenced with the Guardant Health test.

A 2014 study of the blood of 846 patients with 15 different types of cancer in 24 institutions was able to detect the presence of cancer DNA in the body. They found tumor DNA in the blood of more than 80 percent of patients with metastatic cancers and about 47 percent of those with localized tumors. The test does not indicate the tumor site(s) or other information about the tumor. The test did not produce false positives.

Such tests may also be useful to assess whether malignant cells remain in patients whose tumors have been surgically removed. Up to 30 percent are expected to relapse because some tumor cells remain. Initial studies identified about half the patients who later relapsed, again without false positives.

Another potential use is to track the specific DNA mutations driving a tumor. Many new cancer medications block specific molecular processes. Such tests could allow easier targeting of therapy to tumor.

Precancerous conditions
For easily detected and accessed sites, any suspicious lesions may be assessed. Originally, this was skin or superficial masses. X-ray, then later CT, MRI, and ultrasound along with endoscopy extended the range.

Inflammatory conditions

A biopsy of the temporal arteries is often performed for suspected vasculitis.
In inflammatory bowel disease (Crohn's disease and ulcerative colitis), frequent biopsies are taken to assess the activity of disease and to assess changes that precede malignancy.

Biopsy specimens are often taken from part of a lesion when the cause of a disease is uncertain or its extent or exact character is in doubt. Vasculitis, for instance, is usually diagnosed on biopsy.
 Kidney disease: Biopsy and fluorescence microscopy are key in the diagnosis of alterations of renal function. The immunofluorescence plays vital role in the diagnosis of Crescentic glomerulonephritis.
 Infectious disease: Lymph node enlargement may be due to a variety of infectious or autoimmune diseases.
 Metabolic disease: Some conditions affect the whole body, but certain sites are selectively biopsied because they are easily accessed. Amyloidosis is a condition where degraded proteins accumulate in body tissues. In order to make the diagnosis, the gingival.
 Transplantation: Biopsies of transplanted organs are performed in order to determine that they are not being rejected or that the disease that necessitated transplant has not recurred.
 Fertility: A testicular biopsy is used for evaluating the fertility of men and find out the cause of a possible infertility, e.g. when sperm quality is low, but hormone levels still are within normal ranges.

Biopsied sites

Analysis of biopsied material
After the biopsy is performed, the sample of tissue that was removed from the patient is sent to the pathology laboratory. A pathologist specializes in diagnosing diseases (such as cancer) by examining tissue under a microscope. When the laboratory (see Histology) receives the biopsy sample, the tissue is processed and an extremely thin slice of tissue is removed from the sample and attached to a glass slide. Any remaining tissue is saved for use in later studies, if required.

The slide with the tissue attached is treated with dyes that stain the tissue, which allows the individual cells in the tissue to be seen more clearly. The slide is then given to the pathologist, who examines the tissue under a microscope, looking for any abnormal findings. The pathologist then prepares a report that lists any abnormal or important findings from the biopsy. This report is sent to the surgeon who originally performed the biopsy on the patient.

References

External links

 Mybiopsyinfo.com - What is a biopsy? How is a biopsy examination performed? This website gives you answers to these and many other questions.
 MyBiopsy.org - Links to a video. Information about biopsy results for patients. This site is created by pathologists, the physicians who diagnose cancer and other diseases by looking at biopsies under a microscope.
 RadiologyInfo - The radiology information resource for patients: Biopsy
 Biopsia de prostata - Prostate biopsy 

 
Surgical procedures and techniques
Interventional radiology